Ubiquinol oxidase (H+-transporting) (cytochrome bb3 oxidase, cytochrome bo oxidase, cytochrome bd-I oxidase) is an enzyme with systematic name ubiquinol:O2 oxidoreductase (H+-transporting). This enzyme catalyses the following chemical reaction

 2 ubiquinol + O2 + n H+in  2 ubiquinone + 2 H2O + n H+out

Ubiquinol oxidase contains a dinuclear centre comprising two hemes, or heme and copper.

References

External links 
 

EC 1.10.3
EC 7.1.1